Kövər is a village and municipality in the Yevlakh Rayon of Azerbaijan. It has a population of 2,423.  The municipality consists of the villages of Kövər and Kolanı.

References

Populated places in Yevlakh District